Irene Bell Bonong (born 6 January 1995) is a Cameroonian sprinter.

Bonong competed individually at the 2014 Commonwealth Games (100 and 200 metres) as well as the 2014 African Championships (100 metres) without progressing from the first round.

As a relay runner, Bonong finished fifth at the 2014 African Championships (4 × 400 metres relay), sixth at the 2015 African Games (4 × 100 metres relay, also disqualified in the 4 × 400 metres relay) and sixth at the 2018 Commonwealth Games (4 × 100 metres relay).

In the 100 metres event Bonong broke the 12-second barrier in June 2017, recording 11.97 in Yaoundé. No wind assistance information was supplied.

References

1995 births
Living people
Cameroonian female sprinters
Athletes (track and field) at the 2014 Commonwealth Games
Athletes (track and field) at the 2018 Commonwealth Games
Commonwealth Games competitors for Cameroon
Athletes (track and field) at the 2015 African Games
African Games competitors for Cameroon
21st-century Cameroonian women